The Duke's Mayo Classic (known before 2020 as the Belk College Kickoff) is an annual college football game played on the opening weekend of the college football season in Charlotte at Bank of America Stadium, home of the Carolina Panthers.

Game results 

Rankings are from the AP Poll.

Future games

Records

By team

By conference

References

External links 

 Official website

College football kickoff games
Sports competitions in Charlotte, North Carolina
Recurring sporting events established in 2015
2015 establishments in North Carolina